Joseph Charles Bambera (born March 21, 1956) is an American prelate of the Roman Catholic Church. He is the tenth and current Bishop of Scranton, serving since April 26, 2010.

Biography

Early life and education
Joseph Bambera was born in Carbondale, Pennsylvania, to Joseph and Irene (née Kucharski) Bambera.
One of two children, he has a sister, Karen. He attended St. Rose of Lima Elementary School and graduated from St. Rose of Lima High School in 1974. Following graduation, Bambera entered the University of Pittsburgh and earned a Bachelor of Arts degree in art history in 1978.

Bambera then began his studies for the priesthood, attending the University of Scranton and St. Pius X Seminary in Dalton, Pennsylvania. He continued his studies at Mary Immaculate Seminary in Northampton, Pennsylvania, where he earned a Master of Divinity degree in 1982. He was ordained to the diaconate by Bishop J. Carroll McCormick on May 14, 1983.

Priestly ministry
Bambera was ordained to the priesthood for the Diocese of Scranton by Bishop John J. O'Connor on November 5, 1983. After his ordination, Bambera was assigned as an assistant pastor at St. Mary of the Assumption Parish in Scranton, Pennsylvania, where he remained for four years.

In 1987, Bambera was transferred to the St. Peter's Cathedral Parish in Scranton.  He served as auditor on the diocesan tribunal, spiritual director of the Legion of Mary, campus minister at Lackawanna College in Scranton and diocesan director of pilgrimages. In 1989, Bambera entered St. Paul's University in Ottawa, Ontario, earning a Licentiate of Canon Law in 1991.

Upon his return to Scranton, Bambera was appointed a judge on the diocesan tribunal. He was later named diocesan director of ecumenism and interfaith affairs in 1993, and vicar for priests in 1995. During his time as priest, Bambera served as pastor in several Pennsylvania parishes:

 Holy Name of Jesus in Scranton (1994–1997), 
 St. John Bosco in Conyngham (1998–2001),
 Visitation of the Blessed Virgin Mary in Dickson City (2001–2007). 
 St. Thomas Aquinas in Archbald (2007 -)
 St. Mary of Czestochowa in Eynon (2007 -)

Bambera was made a prelate of honour by Pope John Paul II in 1997.  Bambera was elected chairman of the diocesan presbyteral council in 2000 and re-elected in 2002. He also served as president of the board of pastors at Bishop Hafey High School in Hazelton, Pennsylvania and Bishop O'Hara High School in Dumore, Pennsylvania along with defender of the bond for the Eparchy of St. Maron of Brooklyn in New York City. He was a board member of the University of Scranton from 2003 to 2009, and was named a board member of St. Michael's School in Hoban Heights, Pennsylvania, in 2004.

Bambera became episcopal vicar for the Central Region of the diocese in 2005. He was appointed canonical consultant for pastoral planning for the diocese in 2007. On August 31, 2009, Bambera was chosen to serve as delegate to Cardinal Justin Rigali, who was the apostolic administrator of the diocese following the resignation of Bishop Joseph Martino. In this position, Bambera oversaw the day-to-day operations of the diocese during the sede vacante.

Bishop of Scranton
On February 23, 2010, Bambera was appointed as bishop of the Diocese of Scranton by Pope Benedict XVI. Following the appointment, Bambera stated,
 His episcopal consecration and installation took place at the Cathedral of St. Peter on April 26, and Cardinal Rigali ceased as apostolic administrator.

On August 31, 2018,  Bambera forbade predecessor Bishop James Timlin from representing the diocese in public, given Timlin's failure to protect children from abusers.  Bambera, who had served as vicar for priests from 1995 to 1998, admitted that he helped Timlin reassign one priest who had abused a minor, although the decision was made by Timlin.  Bambera emphasized that since becoming bishop in 2010, he had pursued a zero-tolerance policy toward clerical abuse.

See also
 
 Catholic Church hierarchy
 Catholic Church in the United States
 Historical list of the Catholic bishops of the United States
 List of Catholic bishops of the United States
 Lists of patriarchs, archbishops, and bishops

References

External links

Diocese of Scranton

Episcopal succession

1956 births
Living people
People from Carbondale, Pennsylvania
University of Scranton trustees
Catholics from Pennsylvania
21st-century Roman Catholic bishops in the United States